Lovejoy High School can refer to:
Lovejoy High School (Georgia), U.S.
Lovejoy High School (Texas), U.S.